The Equatorial Guinea national basketball team is the national basketball team from Equatorial Guinea. It has yet to appear at the FIBA World Championship or the FIBA Africa Championship.

The team was originally set to take part in the AfroBasket 2017 qualification.

At the AfroBasket 2021 qualification, the team started out strong as it won its first four games. Yet, at the end the Equatoguineans did not qualify due to narrowly losing the direct comparison against Guinea by two points.

Competitive record

AfroBasket
Equatorial Guinea has never qualified for an AfroBasket tournament, although it was close in the 2021 qualification.

Team

Current roster
At the AfroBasket 2021 qualification:

See also
Equatorial Guinea national under-19 basketball team
Equatorial Guinea national under-17 basketball team
Equatorial Guinea national 3x3 team
Equatorial Guinea women's national basketball team

References

External links
Profile at FIBA.com
Archived records of Equatorial Guinea team participations
Profile at Twitter

1994 establishments in Equatorial Guinea
Men's national basketball teams
Basketball
Basketball in Equatorial Guinea